The West Indies cricket team toured Australia in the 1975–76 season and played six Test matches and 1 ODI against Australia.

The test series was built up as an unofficial World Championship series for title of best test team in the world. The West Indies entered the series after winning the 1975 World Cup defeating Australia with several exciting young talents most notably in Gordon Greenidge, Andy Roberts and Viv Richards. Australia win the first test in Gabba convincingly by 8 wickets but West Indies came back and defeat them in WACA by an innings. However, Australia recovered and pummeled the West Indies in remaining games and won the series by 5–1.

The series was a watershed event in West Indies cricket history who thereafter opted the formula of playing four out and out fast bowlers after witnessing the destruction caused by Dennis Lillee and Jeff Thomson bowling close to 100 mph.

Gordon Greenidge who went into the tour as an exciting young batter struggle badly against Lillee and Thomson before eventually dropped after his confidence was crushed. Therefore, Clive Llyod opted to use Viv Richards as opener with Roy Fredericks in last two tests. Despite getting good starts Viv failed to capitalise in first four games although coming at first in last two games he scored two centuries and one fifty ending the tour with 426 runs in 10 innings. This tour was also described as come of age for Viv Richards who went on to become the best batsman in the world and one of few positives for West Indies in a dreadful tour.

This was first test series for Greg Chappell as captain of Australia succeeding his brother Ian Chappell. In last test at MCG, Lance Gibbs took his 308th test scalp passing Fred Trueman.

Test series summary

First Test

Second Test

Third Test

Fourth Test

Fifth Test

Sixth Test

Only ODI 
Between the 2nd and 3rd Tests a 40 over ODI was played.

References

Annual reviews
 Playfair Cricket Annual 1976
 Wisden Cricketers' Almanack 1976

Further reading
 Bill Frindall, The Wisden Book of Test Cricket 1877-1978, Wisden, 1979
 Chris Harte, A History of Australian Cricket, Andre Deutsch, 1993

External links
 West Indies tour of Australia 1975-76 on ESPN Cricinfo
 CricketArchive – tour summaries

1975 in Australian cricket
1975 in West Indian cricket
1975–76 Australian cricket season
1976 in Australian cricket
1976 in West Indian cricket
International cricket competitions from 1975–76 to 1980
1975-76